Big Ideas may refer to:

 Big Ideas (Australia), a radio program
 Big Ideas (film), a 1993 TV movie
 Big Ideas (Pub Philosophy), events series in London
 "Big Ideas" (song), a 2008 song by LCD Soundsystem
 Big Ideas (TV series), a Canadian television series
 Big Ideas Learning, an educational publisher
 James May's Big Ideas, a television miniseries

See also
 Big Idea (disambiguation)